Ghassimu Sow (born 10 April 1995) is an English footballer who plays for Carshalton Athletic as a midfielder.

Sow began his career with Crystal Palace, spending loan spells with Finnish club FC Honka and English non-league club Farnborough.

Early and personal life
Born in Liberia, Sow moved to England at the age of 8.

Club career
Sow signed a three-year professional contract with Crystal Palace in April 2012. In May 2014 Sow joined Finnish side FC Honka on a three-month loan deal, where he made seven  appearances in the Veikkausliiga. He signed a one-month loan deal with Conference South club Farnborough in January 2015.
On 8 May 2015, it was announced that Sow would not be offered a new contract by Crystal Palace and would leave the club.

Sow signed for St Albans City in August 2015, before moving to Dulwich Hamlet in January 2016. After finishing the 2015–16 season with Dulwich, making 11 appearances in all competitions, the club announced that they were not offering Sow a new contract ahead of the 2016–17 season.

Sow joined Lewes in August 2016.

In July 2018, Sow joined Isthmian League Premier Division side Merstham. One year later, he joined Kingstonian. He combined his non-league career with roles at Crystal Palace as a player liaison officer and as head coach of their under-9 team. In June 2022 he moved to Carshalton Athletic.

International career
Sow represented England at under-16 youth level.

References

1995 births
Living people
English footballers
Black British sportspeople
Crystal Palace F.C. players
FC Honka players
Farnborough F.C. players
St Albans City F.C. players
Dulwich Hamlet F.C. players
Lewes F.C. players
Merstham F.C. players
Kingstonian F.C. players
Veikkausliiga players
National League (English football) players
Association football midfielders
English expatriate footballers
Liberian emigrants to the United Kingdom
English people of Liberian descent
English expatriate sportspeople in Finland
Expatriate footballers in Finland
England youth international footballers
Crystal Palace F.C. non-playing staff
Carshalton Athletic F.C. players
Liberian footballers